Three Billboards Outside Ebbing, Missouri is a 2017 black comedy crime film written, produced, and directed by Martin McDonagh. The film stars Frances McDormand as a mother who, when the police in her town fail to find a suspect in her daughter's murder, purchases three billboards to call public attention to the unsolved crime, polarizing the community. Woody Harrelson, Sam Rockwell, John Hawkes, and Peter Dinklage feature in supporting roles.

The film premiered at the 74th Venice International Film Festival on September 4, 2017. It began a limited release in the United States on November 10, 2017, before Fox Searchlight Pictures gave the film a wide release at over 1,430 theaters in the United States and Canada on December 1. The film has so far earned $159.6 million at the worldwide box office, against a production budget of $12 million. Rotten Tomatoes, a review aggregator, surveyed 243 reviews and judged 93% of them to be positive. Metacritic calculated a weighted average score of 88 out of 100 based on 49 reviews, indicating "universal acclaim".

Three Billboards Outside Ebbing, Missouri has received numerous awards and nominations, recognizing the cast's performances, particularly McDormand and Rockwell; several technical areas, including the film's cinematography, sound, and editing; and McDonagh's screenplay and direction. The film garnered six nominations at the 75th Golden Globe Awards and won Best Motion Picture – Drama, Best Actress – Drama for McDormand, Best Supporting Actor for Rockwell, and Best Screenplay. At the 23rd Critics' Choice Awards, the film was nominated for six awards and won Best Actress for McDormand, Best Supporting Actor for Rockwell, and Best Acting Ensemble. The film was nominated for 7 Oscars at the 90th Academy Awards, including Best Picture, Best Original Screenplay for Martin McDonagh, Best Actress for Frances McDormand and two Best Supporting Actor nominations for both Sam Rockwell and Woody Harrelson, with Rockwell and McDormand winning in their respective categories. In addition, the American Film Institute selected Three Billboards Outside Ebbing, Missouri as one of its ten films of the year.

Accolades

Notes

See also
 2017 in film

References

External links 
 

Lists of accolades by film